Miteside Halt railway station is a railway station on the 15" gauge Ravenglass & Eskdale Railway in Cumbria, England. It is located where public footpath and the railway cross, a short way west of the passing loop.  It was first opened in the days of the 3ft gauge railway, to serve the residents of the nearby Miteside House.  To provide protection from the elements, a upturned boat hull was provided as a shelter.  This tradition of using a boat hull as a shelter continues to this day, the current boat is the third one in the halt's history.

Accessibility
Miteside Halt is only accessible by a public footpath, not in any way suitable for wheelchair users. Therefore, the company have taken the decision not to allow wheelchair users to depart at this station.

References 

Heritage railway stations in Cumbria
Ravenglass and Eskdale Railway